The International School of Latvia  founded in 1994, is an independent co-educational, non-profit, college preparatory day school, for students of all nationalities 3 – 18 years of age.  
The International School of Latvia is an English language learning environment.  It is a 15-minute drive from the center of Riga in the township of Piņķi, near the coastal resort of Jūrmala. The school was originally located in Jūrmala and in 2011 ISL moved to its current campus in Pinki.

Students from over 35 countries attend the school. In 2006, ISL had its first IB Diploma graduates.

Administrative staff

As of March 2020

References

External links
 http://www.isl.edu.lv
 http://isl.edu.lv/about-us/guiding-statements/

Educational institutions established in 1994
Schools in Latvia
International Baccalaureate schools in Latvia
International schools in Latvia
1994 establishments in Latvia